The 2016 season for the  cycling team began in January at the Tour Down Under. It was also the team's first season as a UCI WorldTeam.

Team roster

Season victories

National, Continental and World champions 2016

Footnotes

References

External links
 

2016 road cycling season by team
Team Qhubeka NextHash
2016 in South African sport